D'Amour is a surname. Notable people with the surname include:

Denis D'Amour (1959–2005), Canadian guitarist for the heavy metal band Voivod
France D'Amour (born 1967), a Quebecoise francophone pop music singer
Paul D'Amour (born 1967), an American musician, and the first bass guitarist for progressive metal band Tool

See also
 Damour (surname)
 D'Amours (surname)
 Amour (disambiguation)
 L'Amour (disambiguation)